Tomas Gadeikis (born January 30, 1984) is a retired Lithuanian sprint canoeist who has competed since 2005. He won four medals in the C-2 200 m event at the ICF Canoe Sprint World Championships with two golds (2009, 2010) and two bronzes (2006, 2007).

Gadeikis also competed in the C-2 500 m event at the 2008 Summer Olympics in Beijing, but was eliminated in the semifinals.

In 2014 Gadeikis announced about his retirement from professional sport.

References

Canoe09.ca profile

Sports-reference.com profile

1984 births
Canoeists at the 2008 Summer Olympics
Lithuanian male canoeists
Living people
Olympic canoeists of Lithuania
ICF Canoe Sprint World Championships medalists in Canadian